Soroti–Katakwi–Moroto–Lokitanyala Road is a road in the Eastern and Northern regions of Uganda. The road connects the urban centers of Soroti, the largest city in Teso sub-region, to Katakwi, the district headquarters of Katakwi District and to Moroto, the largest city in the Karamoja sub-region. It ends at Lokitanyala, at the international border with Kenya.

Location
The road starts at Soroti and continues northeastwards through Katakwi, and on to Moroto.

Overview
Prior to 2016 this transport corridor posed serious challenges to residents and visitors, who endured the dust and potholes during the dry season. In the rainy season the road became a bog, with vehicles stuck in the mud for days, sometimes for weeks.

Upgrading to bitumen
In November 2016, the upgrade of the road to grade II bitumen standard, with culverts, shoulders and drainage channels began. The work was contracted to  China Communications Construction Company Limited (CCCC) and China Railway Group 3 Construction Company. The construction bill totaled USh646.8 billion (approx. US$175 million), funded by the government of Uganda and other development partners.

The work on the Soroti–Katakwi–Moroto section was completed in late 2019. Official handover to the Ugandan government is expected in 2020. As of January 2020, the road had been fully tarmacked from Soroti to Moroto, and was open to the public. The Moroto–Lokitanyala section is expected to be tarmacked during the 2020/2021 financial year that begins in July 2020.

On 21 November 2020, the government received the completed Soroti–Katakwi–Moroto section. President Yoweri Museveni presided over these events.

See also
 Moroto District
 Katakwi District
 Soroti District
 Economy of Uganda
 List of roads in Uganda

References

External links
 Uganda National Road Authority Homepage
 Government Is On Steady Progress In Road Infrastructural Development As at 11 April 2019.

Roads in Uganda
Moroto District
Napak District
Katakwi District
Soroti District
Northern Region, Uganda
Eastern Region, Uganda